Posht Pari (also Romanized as Posht Parī; also known as Posht Barī) is a village in Khalili Rural District, in the Central District of Gerash County, Fars Province, Iran. At the 2016 census, its population was 120, in 35 families.

References 

Populated places in Gerash County